Glasgow Pollok is a constituency of the Scottish Parliament (Holyrood), being one of eight constituencies within the Glasgow City council area. It elects one Member of the Scottish Parliament (MSP) by the plurality (first past the post) method of election. It is also one of nine constituencies in the Glasgow electoral region, which elects seven additional members, in addition to the nine constituency MSPs, to produce a form of proportional representation for the region as a whole.

The seat has been held by Humza Yousaf of the Scottish National Party since the 2016 Scottish Parliament election.

Electoral region 

The other eight constituencies of the Glasgow region are Glasgow Anniesland, Glasgow Cathcart, Glasgow Kelvin, Glasgow Maryhill and Springburn, Glasgow Provan, Glasgow Shettleston, Glasgow Southside and Rutherglen.

The region covers the Glasgow City council area and a north-western portion of the South Lanarkshire council area.

Constituency boundaries 

The Glasgow Pollok constituency was created at the same time as the Scottish Parliament, in 1999, with the name and boundaries of an  existing Westminster constituency. In 2005, however, Scottish Westminster (House of Commons) constituencies were mostly replaced with new constituencies.

Boundary review

Following its First Periodic review into Scottish Parliament constituencies, a newly shaped Pollok was formed in time for the 2011 Scottish Parliament election. The Glasgow City Council electoral wards used in the creation of the new Glasgow Pollok seat are:

In full: Greater Pollok, Craigton
In part: Govan

Member of the Scottish Parliament

Election results

2020s

2010s

2000s

1990s

 
 
 
 
 ,

See also
 Politics of Glasgow

Notes

External links

Constituencies of the Scottish Parliament
Politics of Glasgow
Scottish Parliament constituencies and regions from 2011
1999 establishments in Scotland
Constituencies established in 1999
Scottish Parliament constituencies and regions 1999–2011
Govan